Kizimkazi - officially Kizimkazi Mkunguni, but also known as Kizimkazi Mtendeni - is a fishing village on the southern coast of Zanzibar, Tanzania, and was once a walled city. It is situated three miles southeast of the Kizimkazi Mosque (which is located in Kizimkazi Dimbani, commonly known just as Dimbani). In recent years, Kizimkazi has become a major tourist attraction, as daily boat tours are organized to bring visitors off shore to watch bottlenose dolphins and swim with them.

See also
Historic Swahili Settlements

References

External links

Photo of Kizimkazi Beach

Villages in Zanzibar
Swahili people
Swahili city-states
Swahili culture